The six-coupled P 5 of the Palatinate Railway (Pfalzbahn) was to replace the four-coupled locomotives in the Palatinate. They were given a leading Krauss-Helmholtz bogie and a trailing bogie in order to achieve satisfactory weight distribution.

The firm of Krauss delivered twelve examples in 1908. One notable feature was the particularly large coal and water tanks requested by the Railway. The Deutsche Reichsbahn took all the vehicles over and converted them to superheated engines. After the end of the Second World War nine were left. Most of them were sold to private railways. The last one owned by the Deutsche Bundesbahn was retired in 1951.

After the Palatine P 5 had proved successful, the Royal Bavarian State Railways (Königlich Bayerische Staatsbahn) decided to procure more of this class in a more powerful version. As a result, the Palatine Pt 3/6 was built from 1911. A total of 19 engines were procured. In 1923 a further 10 of these two-cylinder superheated steam engines were ordered for Bavaria as the Bavarian Pt 3/6. They were deployed on the express train routes between Garmisch-Partenkirchen and Munich. All the engines were taken over by the Reichsbahn, the Bavarian versions being given the operating numbers 77 110–119. One machine was lost during the Second World War. The Deutsche Bundesbahn took over 27 engines and retired them by 1954. One locomotive remained with the East German DR and was retired in 1956.

See also 
 Royal Bavarian State Railways
 Palatinate Railway
 List of Bavarian locomotives and railbuses
 List of Palatine locomotives and railbuses

References

Literature 
 Horst J. Obermayer: Taschenbuch Deutsche Dampflokomotiven. Regelspur. 2nd edn., Franckh'sche Verlagshandlung, Stuttgart 1971, ISBN 3-440-03643-X
 
 
 Manfred Weisbrod, Hans Müller, Wolfgang Petznick: Dampflokomotiven 3. Baureihen 61 bis 98. 4. Auflage, transpress Verlagsgesellschaft, Berlin 1994, ISBN 3-344-70841-4, S. 85 ff.
 
 Karl Ernst Maedel, Alfred B. Gottwald: Deutsche Dampflokomotiven. Die Entwicklungsgeschichte. Transpress Verlag, Stuttgart 1994/1999, ISBN 3-344-70912-7, S. 211

2-6-4T locomotives
P 5
Railway locomotives introduced in 1908
Krauss locomotives
Standard gauge locomotives of Germany
1′C2′ n2t locomotives
1′C2′ h2t locomotives
Freight locomotives